Einherjer is a Viking metal band from Haugesund, Norway, founded in 1993. Some of the band's albums are heavily folk influenced, while others have a more traditional symphonic black metal sound. Their lyrics retell Norse legends, and each of their albums has its own theme. The band split up in early 2004 after releasing the album Blot in December 2003, but later reformed.

In December 2004, all members of Einherjer's last lineup, including the band's founders Frode Glesnes and Gerhard Storesund, founded the thrash metal band Battered together with bass guitarist Ole Moldesæther.

In September 2008, Einherjer announced that they would reunite to do some selected shows across Europe in 2009, including the Ragnarök, Kaltenbach and Wacken festivals. The band signed with Indie Recordings in December 2010; their first album in eight years, Norrøn was released in September 2011. Einherjer has since released three more studio albums, and the latest one, North Star, was released on February 26, 2021.

Name
The band's name is taken from Norse mythology, where the term Einherjar describes the slain warriors who have gone to Valhalla and joined Odin's table.

Battered
The band was reconstituted in 2004 as "Battered", a thrash band that included Glesnes, Storesund, and Herløe.  A new vocalist joined them in 2005, Siggy Olaisen, The band only released one demo, ...Beyond Recognition, and one album—also named Battered—before disbanding.  The self-titled debut album was released February 27, 2006, in Norway; and March 13 in the rest of Europe. The American release date for the album was April 4, 2006.

Personnel

Current lineup
 Frode Glesnes (previously Grimar) - vocals, guitar and bass (1993 - 2004, 2008–present)
 Gerhard Storesund (previously Ulvar) - drums and keys (1993 - 2004, 2008–present)
 Ole Sønstabø - Lead guitar (2016–present)
 Tom Enge - Guitar & backing vocals (2020–present)

Previous members
 Aksel Herløe - guitar (1999 - 2004, 2008 - 2020)
 Rune Bjelland (previously Nidhogg) - vocals (1993 - 1997)
 Audun Wold (previously Thonar) - bass, keyboards, guitar (1993 - 1997)
 Stein Sund - bass (1995 - 1997)
 Ragnar Vikse - vocals (1997 - 2002)
 Erik Elden - bass (1998)

Session and touring musicians
 Tchort - bass (1998 - 1999)
 Stein Sund - bass (1999)
 Jon Lind - bass (2000 - 2001)
 V'Gandr - bass (2001)
 Kjell Håvardsholm - bass (2002)
 Sigve Husebø - bass (2003)
 Eirik Svendsbø - backing vocals and bass (2008 - 2014)

Battered band members
 Sigurd "Siggy" Olaisen - lead vocals (Headblock)
 Frode Glesnes - guitar and vocals (Einherjer)
 Aksel Herløe - guitar (ex-Einherjer)
 Gerhard Storesund - drums (Einherjer)
 Ole Moldesæther - bass (Headblock)

Timeline

Discography

Studio albums
 Dragons of the North (1996)
 Odin Owns Ye All (1998)
 Norwegian Native Art (2000)
 Blot (2003)
 Norrøn (2011)
 Av Oss For Oss (2014)
 Dragons of the North XX (2016)
 Norrøne Spor (2018)
 North Star (2021)

EPs
 Leve Vikingånden (1995)
 Aurora Borealis (1996)
 Far Far North (1997)

Compilation albums
 Aurora Borealis / Leve vikingånden (2013)

Demos
 Aurora Borealis (1994)
 ...Beyond Recognition, (Battered) 2004

References

External links
 
 Battered's Official Website

Norwegian thrash metal musical groups
Norwegian viking metal musical groups
Norwegian symphonic black metal musical groups
Musical groups established in 1993
Musical groups disestablished in 2004
Musical groups reestablished in 2008
1993 establishments in Norway
2004 disestablishments in Norway
Musical groups from Haugesund